Onchidorididae are a taxonomic family of sea slugs, dorid nudibranchs, marine gastropod molluscs in the superfamily Onchidoridoidea.

Genera
Genera in the family Onchodorididae include:
 Acanthodoris Gray, 1850  
 Knoutsodonta Hallas & Gosliner, 2015
 Onchidoris Blainville, 1816 - synonym: Adalaria Bergh, 1879, Lamellidoris Alder and Hancock, 1855
 Onchimira  Martynov, Korshunova, N. Sanamyan & K. Sanamyan, 2009 with only one species Onchimira cavifera Martynov, Korshunova, N. Sanamyan & K. Sanamyan, 2009

The following genera are currently considered to be synonyms or have been transferred to another family:
 Akiodoris Bergh, 1879  transferred to family Akiodorididae  
 Doridunculus G. O. Sars, 1878 transferred to family Akiodorididae
 Hypobranchiaea A. Adams, 1847 - taxon inquirendum

References

External links

 
Taxa named by John Edward Gray